Deliver Us is the debut studio album by the American heavy metal band Warlord, released in 1983. The album was re-released in 2012 to coincide with the band's reunion.

Track listing

Personnel 

Warlord
 Jack Rucker (Damien King) - lead vocals 
 William J. Tsamis (Destroyer) - guitar, bass (as The Raven)
 Mark Zonder (Thunder Child) - drums 
 Diane Kornarens (Sentinel) - keyboards

Additional musicians
 Bill Krysler - narrator, vocal effects on "Mrs Victoria"

Production'
 Cornell Tannesy - engineer, mixing, mastering
 Maureen Marten - cover art

References

1983 debut albums
Heavy metal albums by American artists
Metal Blade Records albums